Moldestad is a surname. Notable people with the surname include:

Kristine Moldestad (born 1969), Norwegian handball player 
Sigrid Moldestad (born 1972), Norwegian folk singer, musician, and instrumentalist 
Tormod Moldestad, Norwegian handball player

Surnames of Norwegian origin